4090 Říšehvězd, provisional designation , is a stony asteroid from the inner regions of the asteroid belt, approximately 7 kilometers in diameter.

It was discovered by Czech astronomer Antonín Mrkos at Kleť Observatory on 2 September 1986. Named for the astronomy journal Říše hvězd, it is known as having had the most diacritics in its name among all named minor planets before the naming of 229762 Gǃkúnǁʼhòmdímà.

Classification and orbit 

The S-type asteroid orbits the Sun at a distance of 1.9–2.9 AU once every 3 years and 7 months (1,322 days). Its orbit has an eccentricity of 0.21 and an inclination of 1° with respect to the ecliptic. The first observation was made at the U.S. Yerkes Observatory in 1931, extending the asteroid's observation arc by 55 years prior to its official discovery.

Physical characteristics 

In 2009 and 2014, several rotational lightcurves were obtained for this asteroid at the Palomar Transient Factory. They gave a concurring rotation period between 4.53 and 4.56 hours with a brightness variation between 0.32 and 0.41 magnitude.

According to the survey carried out by the NEOWISE mission of NASA's Wide-field Infrared Survey Explorer, the asteroid measures 7.2 kilometers in diameter and its surface has an albedo of 0.149, while the Collaborative Asteroid Lightcurve Link assumes a standard albedo for stony asteroids of 0.20 and calculates a diameter of 6.3 kilometers, based on an absolute magnitude of 13.38.

Naming 

This minor planet was named after the periodically released Czech popular astronomy journal Říše hvězd ("the realm of stars"), which was initially published by the Czech Astronomical Society.

Říše hvězd reported discoveries in the fields of astronomy, astrophysics and space exploration and supplied information about the Czech–Slovak astronomical community. The body's name was proposed by Jana Tichá, Miloš Tichý and Zdeněk Moravec. Naming citation was published on 28 August 1996.

See also 
 Jiří Grygar, chairman of the Czech Astronomical Society and editor at Říše hvězd

References

External links 
 Asteroid Lightcurve Database (LCDB), query form (info )
 Dictionary of Minor Planet Names, Google books
 Asteroids and comets rotation curves, CdR – Observatoire de Genève, Raoul Behrend
 Discovery Circumstances: Numbered Minor Planets (1)-(5000) – Minor Planet Center
 

004090
Discoveries by Antonín Mrkos
Named minor planets
19860902